Richard Molony may refer to:

 Richard S. Molony of Iowa, member of the U.S. House of Representatives
 Richard Molony (carriage maker) of Los Angeles, California